HawkSat-1 was a single-unit CubeSat which was built and is being operated by the Hawk Institute for Space Sciences (HISS), Pocomoke City, Maryland. It is based on a Pumpkin Inc. CubeSat kit, and carries a technology demonstration payload, primarily as a proof of concept mission, testing command, data and power subsystems, as well as solar panels and communications.

It carries a commercial material exposure research payload for an undisclosed "major aerospace company", which exposes a number of material samples to space, and records the effects of exposure on the materials. The data was to be sent to Earth by means of a storage and dump communication system.

Launch 
It was successfully launched on an Orbital Sciences Corporation Minotaur I launch vehicle from Pad 0B at the Mid-Atlantic Regional Spaceport, at 23:55 UTC on 19 May 2009. It was a tertiary payload, with TacSat-3 as the primary payload and PharmaSat as the secondary. Two other CubeSats, AeroCube-3 and CP6, were launched on the same launch vehicle, and together the three satellites are known as the CubeSat Technology Demonstration mission.

Mission 
The satellite was successfully deployed in orbit, but no signals were received.

Atmospheric entry 
The satellite reentered in the atmosphere of Earth on 4 September 2011.

See also 

 List of CubeSats

References

External links 
 
 http://www.hawkspace.org/history.php Hawk Institute for Space Sciences - history

Spacecraft launched in 2009
CubeSats
Spacecraft launched by Minotaur rockets
Spacecraft which reentered in 2011